Subhashish Chakraborty is an Indian politician  and is elected as member of the Rajya Sabha from West Bengal as an All India Trinamool Congress candidate.

References 

Year of birth missing (living people)
Living people
Rajya Sabha members from West Bengal
Trinamool Congress politicians from West Bengal